Diego de la Hoya Villegas (born August 13, 1994) is a Mexican professional boxer who held the WBC-NABF and WBO-NABO super bantamweight titles between 2017 and 2019. As an amateur he represented Mexico, winning the 2011 Mexican National Championships and competing at the 2012 Youth World Championships. He is the cousin of former boxer Oscar De La Hoya.

Early life
De la Hoya was born in the Mexican border town of Mexicali, in a boxing family, and was surrounded by boxing ever since he was born. He is said to have fallen in love with the sport of boxing at the age of 6, although he had been boxing even before that. As his interest in the sport grew, he decided to take up boxing full-time at the age of 15. Growing up he idolized Mexican boxing legends Julio Cesar Chavez, and his cousin Oscar De La Hoya. De la Hoya lives with his parents and loves playing soccer.

Amateur career
Diego joined the Mexican National Boxing team in 2009. De la Hoya had over 250 amateur bouts and was a Mexican National Olympics silver medalist.

Professional career
Diego is signed to Oscar De La Hoya's Golden Boy Promotions. He made his professional debut on September 12, 2013, in Las Vegas, Nevada against Luis Cosme who had already had eleven professional fights. De La Hoya won the fight via technical knockout (TKO) at 1:53 min in the third round.

The second fight was in the city of Indio, California on December 13, 2013. De La Hoya won the fight via TKO at 2:32 minutes in the first round against Abraham Rubio who had already had six professional fights.

De La Hoya fought his third fight on March 14, 2014, and won in a first round stoppage, bringing his record to 3–0.

De La Hoya won his fourth fight on April 3, again in the Fantasy Springs Casino in Indio, California. "The Golden Kid" won by unanimous decision (UD) in six rounds against Puerto Rican Jaxel Marrero. He won his next four fights with three coming by way of TKO.

On September 4, 2015, De La Hoya stepped up and faced Jesus Ruiz, who had earlier that year lost to Leo Santa Cruz in a world title fight. De La Hoya won the fight via UD (100–90, 100–90, 99–91).

On the undercard of Canelo Álvarez vs. Amir Khan, De La Hoya faced undefeated Rocco Santomauro. He successfully defended his WBC Youth title when Santomauro's trainer Shane Mosley threw in the towel in the seventh round.

De La Hoya defeated former IBF bantamweight champion Randy Caballero on September 16, 2017, on the undercard of Canelo Álvarez vs. Gennady Golovkin.

He also won his next fight against José Salgado via a seventh-round TKO. De la Hoya was the constant aggressor which prompted Salgado's team to throw in the towel.

On April 13, 2019, had his first fight at featherweight against Enrique Bernache. An accidental head clash caused a bad cut on Bernache's forehead, which led to the fight being stopped and ruled as a no-contest.

On July 13, 2019, Diego, then ranked #3 by the WBA at super bantamweight, faced Ronny Rios, ranked #8 by the WBA at the Dignity Health Sports Park in California. De la Hoya got into the fight as the favorite, however, Rios managed to drop De la Hoya, who despite beating the count, could not continue fighting. This was Diego's first loss as a professional.

He then battled veteran Renson Robles in his hometown of Mexicali to a ten-round UD win. De la Hoya stated after the fight that he had injured his left hand during the second round.

Professional boxing record

References

External links

Diego De La Hoya on Box.Live

1994 births
Living people
Boxers from Baja California
Sportspeople from Mexicali
Featherweight boxers
Mexican male boxers
Super-bantamweight boxers